Captain Sir Neville Archibald Gass  (14 June 1893 – 23 September 1965) was a British businessman. He was the third chairman of the board of British Petroleum, from 1957 to 1960.

Gass was born in Madras, British India, to Horace Archibald Campbell Gass, who worked in the Forest Department, and Gertrude Louisa Martin. He was educated at Tonbridge School and at McGill University in Montreal. In the First World War, he served in the Royal Field Artillery and later in the Royal Horse Artillery, and for his services was awarded the Military Cross and the Belgian Croix de Guerre.

Shortly after the war, he joined the British Petroleum Company, working first in London and then until 1934 in Persia. He was appointed managing director of BP in 1939, deputy chairman in 1956, and chairman in 1957. In 1960, he was succeeded by Maurice Bridgeman as chairman.

He was appointed a Commander of the Order of the British Empire (CBE) in 1953, and in 1958 was knighted (KBE) in the same order.

Gass died at the King Edward VII's Hospital for Officers, London, on 23 September 1965.

References

1893 births
1965 deaths
People educated at Tonbridge School
McGill University alumni
Knights Commander of the Order of the British Empire
British businesspeople in the oil industry
British chairpersons of corporations
Chairmen of BP
People from Chennai
British Army personnel of World War I
Royal Field Artillery officers
Royal Horse Artillery officers
Recipients of the Military Cross
Recipients of the Croix de guerre (Belgium)
British people in colonial India
Military personnel of British India